Hexametra is a genus of nematodes belonging to the family Ascarididae.

The genus has almost cosmopolitan distribution.

Species:
Hexametra boddaertii 
Hexametra bozkovi 
Hexametra quadricornis

References

Nematodes